The Central Virginia Waste Management Authority (CVWMA) is a public service authority that implements solid waste management and recycling programs for thirteen local governments in Virginia.   CVWMA’s programs include curbside recycling, drop-off recycling centers, electronics recycling, and household hazardous waste collection.

In 1989, the Virginia General Assembly mandated the development of solid waste management plans to achieve a minimum twenty-five (25) percent recycling rate by 1995.  Thirteen local governments created the CVWMA in December 1990 to work cooperatively as a region in satisfying Virginia’s recycling requirement.

Members of the CVWMA include: 
Ashland
Charles City County
Chesterfield County
Colonial Heights
Goochland County
Hanover County
Henrico County
Hopewell
New Kent County
Petersburg
Powhatan County
Prince George County
Richmond

Each member community appoints one or more representatives (by population) to the CVWMA Board of Directors, which governs the actions of the Authority.  The Authority may contract for and maintain any garbage and refuse collection, transfer and disposal program or system within the cities, counties or town that are members of the CVWMA.  This can include waste reduction, waste material recovery, recycling as mandated by law or otherwise, landfill operation, household hazardous waste management and disposal, and similar programs or systems.

External links
Central Virginia Waste Management Authority official website
Virginia Department of Environmental Quality Office of Recycling and Litter Prevention
Virginia Recycling Association

Government of Virginia
Waste organizations